Gâteau Basque ("cake of the house") is a traditional dessert from the Northern Basque region of France, typically filled with black cherry jam or pastry cream. Gâteau Basque with cream is more typical in the Southern Basque region of Spain.

Description

Typically Gâteau Basque is constructed from layers of a butter-sugar wheat flour pastry dough (in this case pâte sablée, not brisée) with a filling of either black cherry jam or almond or vanilla pastry cream. It has been argued that only black Xapata cherries native to the Basque Country should be used. 

The type of dough used may vary a little. If butter is warmed before mixing with flour the dough will be called pâte sucrée. If it is cold the mixing process will require more work and the dough is called pâte sablée (it is crumblier). The resulting textures are a little different but mostly for the initiated taster. The flour used is a soft wheat flour with little mineral content (that is, a refined flour, common pastry/cake flour) The proportion of sugar used also varies. But the principle of this cake is having a soft shortbread-type dough 3 to 6 mm thick filled with an almond pastry cream, also called frangipane, and with a shiny egg-coating.

The dough is rolled out like a double crust pie and filled with jam or pastry cream. Similar to the Boston cream pie, which is a cake and not a pie, the Gâteau Basque dough produces a crumb-textured pastry that is chewy and tender.

It is traditional to mark a Basque cross on the top if the cake is filled with black cherry jam, or to use a crosshatch pattern on top if filled with pastry cream.

History

The origins of Gâteau Basque are tied strongly with the town of Cambo-les-Bains, Labourd. It may have originally been made with bread and called bistochak in the 18th century. The fishermen took it out to sea. The first known commercialisation of the cake was by Marianne Hirigoyen in Cambo in the first half of the 19th century. Later editions were flavoured with rum, brought back to France by Basques from the West Indies.

The Gâteau Basque Festival (Fête du Gâteau Basque) is organized each year in Cambo-les-Bains. Eguzkia ("sun" in Basque), an association to promote quality Basque cake, was founded in France in 1994. There is a museum dedicated to the cake, Le musée du Gâteau Basque, in Sare, Labourd.

See also
 List of cherry dishes

References

External links

  Gâteau Basque Festival

French pastries
Basque cuisine
Cherry dishes
Almond desserts
Custard desserts
Foods with jam